The TT Circuit Assen is a motorsport race track built in 1955 and located in Assen, Netherlands. Host of the Dutch TT, it is popularly referred to as "The Cathedral" of motorcycling by the fans of the sport. It has a capacity of 110,000 spectators, including 60,000 seats. Since 1992, the circuit has also been part of the World SBK calendar except the 2020 season.

History 

The original Assen track was first used for the 1926 Dutch TT (Tourist Trophy) race, after the first 1925 event was held on country roads through the villages of Rolde, Borger, Schoonloo and Grolloo, and organized by the Motorclub Assen en Omstreken. From 1926 on the Dutch TT was held at Assen on a street circuit through De Haar, Barteldsbocht, Oude Tol, Hooghalen, Laaghalen and Laaghalerveen.

In 1954, Geoff Duke of Great Britain reached . The circuit remained unchanged until 1955, when a whole new circuit was built by using a third of the original street circuit, joined with purpose-built sections, but less than a third of the length and much more like a modern road racing circuit.

In the period of 1999–2002, the circuit invested millions in upgrades. In 1999, the circuit management placed a new main grandstand and hospitality buildings. In 2000, a new Race Control tower was built, as well as 34 newly equipped pit boxes, a new media and medical centre. Between September 2001 and April 2002, another €9 million was spent on the enlargement of the paddock area from 40 to 60.000 square metres. This upgrade meant that the Veenslang and Ruskenhoek corners had to be altered. The main straight has also moved about 50 metres eastwards and a new two-lane tunnel now connects the paddock with the main entrance road and the media accreditation / welcome centre. The Mandeveen and Duikersloot corners have been moved back by 10 metres to accommodate larger run-offs and gravel beds at the southern part of the circuit. That part of the track has also been resurfaced with new asphalt. The total cost of these upgrades was €23 million.

In 2005, the grandstand at the Geert Timmer corner was slightly altered. In order to improve the gravel run-off length, the grandstand was made in a 'floating' manner to accommodate the extra space that was needed. The lay-out of the circuit was also slightly altered.

The circuit was fundamentally redesigned again in 2006, becoming the so-called A-Style Assen TT Circuit. All alterations aside, only one section of the circuit is original; the finish line never moved. On 21 September 2009 it was announced that a new chicane will be added, after a request from the A1GP organization, however A1GP was unable to start the 2009–2010 season and as a substitute the Superleague Formula replaced A1GP.

Layout history

Current racetrack

The curves in Assen were traditionally banked and the surface is extremely grippy, so the riders were able to drive much faster on the course than other circuits. Today these sloped or curved bends have been modified due to safety issues.

Innovation
On 6 July 2004, the organisation announced plans for an amusement park located to the north of the track. The new centre is expected to be visited by 300,000 people, and the total investment is approximately €85 million.

Lap records 

The official fastest race lap records at the TT Circuit Assen are listed as:

Events

 Current

 April: Superbike World Championship, Supersport World Championship, Supersport 300 World Championship
 June: Grand Prix motorcycle racing Dutch TT, MotoE World Championship Dutch eRace, RSG Hamburg Assen/HAT
 July: Truckstar Festival
 August: Sidecar World Championship, BOSS GP Jack’s Casino Racing Days, Supercar Challenge, Porsche Carrera Cup Benelux, GT & Prototype Challenge, IDM Superbike Championship
 September: ADAC Racing Weekend Assen, Assen Classic GP
 October: Supercar Challenge, GT & Prototype Challenge

 Former

 ADAC GT Masters (2008–2011)
 ATS Formel 3 Cup (2004–2012)
 British Superbike Championship (2012–2019)
 Champ Car World Series (2007)
 Deutsche Tourenwagen Masters (2019–2021)
 European Truck Racing Championship (2004–2005, 2009)
 FIM Endurance World Championship (1979–1980, 1995–1996, 2003–2006)
 Formula 750 (1976–1979)
 Formula Renault Northern European Cup (2006–2017)
 Motocross World Championship (2015–2018)
 SMP F4 Championship (2017–2018)
 Superleague Formula (2010–2011)
 TCR Europe Touring Car Series (2018)
 W Series (2019)

See also
 Dutch TT
 MotoGP

References

External links

 RacingCircuit.info's history of the TT Circuit Assen
 Trackpedia's guide to racing and tracking at Assen
 TT Circuit Assen homesite

Assen
Assen
Assen
TT Circuit Assen
TT
TT
TT Circuit Assen
TT Circuit Assen
20th-century architecture in the Netherlands